Aleksandr Sergeyevich Bulanovskiy (born 29 June 1987) is a former Russian professional football player.

Club career
He played in the Russian Football National League for FC Metallurg Krasnoyarsk in 2006.

External links
 
 

1987 births
Living people
Russian footballers
Association football midfielders
FC Yenisey Krasnoyarsk players
FC Novokuznetsk players
FC Nosta Novotroitsk players